Richard J. DiBiaso (February 6, 1941 – October 19, 2017) was an American college basketball coach for Stanford University.

From Monessen, Pennsylvania, DiBiaso played college basketball for coach Bill Gibson at Mansfield State (now Mansfield University of Pennsylvania). Years later, DiBiaso got his college coaching break from Beacon High School in Beacon, New York when Gibson hired him as an assistant at Virginia. In 1971, Digger Phelps added DiBiaso to his first staff at Notre Dame, where he stayed until 1975.

in 1975, DiBiaso was named head coach at Stanford. In his first season, DiBiaso took a team that returned one starter and experienced significant injuries to a 9–18 record. Eleven of the losses were by six points are fewer. His efforts were recognized at the end of the season when he was named Pac-8 Conference co-coach of the year with George Raveling. DiBiaso would stay for several more seasons and was given a two-year contract in February 1981. However, he announced he was resigning at the end of the 1981–82 season in February of 1982.

DiBiaso died on October 19, 2017 in Auburn, California. He was survived by his wife, Shawna, and children Brian and Shawne.

References

External links
College record @ sports-reference.com

1941 births
2017 deaths
American men's basketball coaches
American men's basketball players
Basketball coaches from Pennsylvania
Basketball players from Pennsylvania
College men's basketball head coaches in the United States
College men's basketball players in the United States
High school basketball coaches in New York (state)
Mansfield University of Pennsylvania alumni
Notre Dame Fighting Irish men's basketball coaches
People from Monessen, Pennsylvania
Point guards
Stanford Cardinal men's basketball coaches
Virginia Cavaliers men's basketball coaches